Emilio Lunghi (16 March 1887, in Genoa – 27 September 1925) was an Italian athlete. He won the silver medal in the men's 800 metres race at the 1908 Summer Olympics in London, making him the first Italian to win an Olympic medal.

Biography
His time in the race was 1:54.2, which beat the previous Olympic record by 1.8 seconds but was still 1.4 seconds behind the time of Mel Sheppard, who took gold and set a new record at 1:52.8. Lunghi had won his semifinal heat with a time of 1:57.2 to advance to the final.

Lunghi also competed in the 1500 metres. His first-round heat also included Norman Hallows; both of the two runners broke the Olympic record in that heat, but Hallows came out on top by running the race in 4:03.4 as opposed to Lunghi's 4:03.8.

After the 1908 Olympics, Lunghi spent a year New York City, and competed as a member of the Irish American Athletic Club while in the U.S., establishing three world's records in the 700 yard, 880 yard and two-thirds of a mile distances.

National titles
Emilio Lunghi won the individual national championship nine times in six different events.
1 win on 400 metres (1908)
1 win on 800 metres (1914)
3 wins on 1000 metres (1908, 1911, 1912)
2 wins on 1500 metres (1906, 1913)
1 win on 1200 metres steeplechase (1912)
1 win on 400 metres hurdles (1913)

References

Notes

External links
 
 
 
 
 Emilio Lunghi at Asaibrunobonomelli.it 
 
 Emilio Lunghi at Wingedfist.org

1887 births
1925 deaths
Italian male middle-distance runners
Italian male steeplechase runners
Athletes (track and field) at the 1908 Summer Olympics
Athletes (track and field) at the 1912 Summer Olympics
Olympic athletes of Italy
Sportspeople from Genoa
Olympic silver medalists for Italy
Medalists at the 1908 Summer Olympics
Olympic silver medalists in athletics (track and field)
Italian Athletics Championships winners